Kim Jin-su or Kim Jin-soo (김진수) may also refer to:
Kim Jin-su (speed skater, born 1976), South Korean Olympic speed skater
Kim Jin-su (speed skater, born 1992), South Korean speed skater
Kim Jin-su, South Korean footballer, born 1992
Jin Soo Kim, Chicago installation artist born 1950
Choi Jin-soo, formerly known as Jin Soo Kim, South Korean basketball player born 1989
Kim Jin-soo (actor), actor and broadcaster, born 1971
Kim Jin-soo (biologist), entrepreneur and chemist-turned-biologist, born 1964
Kim Jin-soo (wrestler), South Korean former amateur Greco-Roman wrestler

Korean-language names